12/24 Karol Bagh is an Indian television comedy-drama series that aired on Zee TV set in the Karol Bagh area of Delhi. The series premiered on 31 August 2009. The series was directed by Ravi Bhushan shot in both Delhi and Mumbai studios. The story dealt with the conflicts between today's kids' generation and their parents. The series started the trend of TV serials being set in Delhi.

Brief synopsis
12/24 Karol Bagh, Delhi is the address of the Sethi family. The head of the family is Mr. Rajinder Sethi who owns a shop selling bridal wear. He is a simple man who does not believe in God. His wife Manju Sethi is a practical woman who has a positive outlook towards life. Simi (Smriti Kalra), the eldest daughter, is 28 years of age and is still unmarried. The second child is Anuj (Wasim Mushtaq), who works in a bank. Anuj has a girlfriend but is waiting for his elder sister to get married. The third child is Neetu (Sargun Mehta) who is happy go lucky, extremely boisterous and whose only goal is to get married. And the youngest daughter is Mili (Hunar Hali), who is street smart, bold and realistic. The show revolves primarily around Simi and her marriage. Despite her sweet nature, she has been rejected several times owing to her weight. As the story progresses, it reflects upon the social stigma surrounding unmarried daughters through the struggles of the Sethi family.

Cast

Main

 Smriti Kalra as Simran "Simi/Simo" Sethi Taneja: Abhinav's wife, Rajinder and Manju's daughter, Anuj, Neetu and Mili's sister and Anita's and Omkar's sister in law 
 Neil Bhatt as Abhinav "Abhi" Taneja: Simi's husband, Anita's younger brother Taneja family's son and Sethi family's son in law 
 Ravi Dubey as Omkar "Omi" Dagar, Neetu's husband
 Sargun Mehta as Neetu Sethi Dagar

Recurring cast
 Alka Amin as Manju Sethi:  Mother of Simi, Anuj, Neetu and Mili, Rajinder's wife and Abhinav, Anita and Omkar's mother in law
 Banwari Taneja as Rajinder Sethi: Father of Simi, Anuj, Neetu and Mili, Manju's husband and Abhinav, Anita and Omkar's father in law
 Hunar Hali as Mili Sethi
 Wasim Mushtaq as Anuj Sethi
 Devyani Shiv Bhatia as Anita Anuj Sethi (née Taneja)
 Indresh Malik as Rajeev Bhalla
 Manish Nawani as Nakul Singh Dagar 
 Akshay Dogra as Vishal
 Manit Joura as Vicky 
 Yuri Suri as Mr. Taneja
 Mala Mishra as Mrs. Anusha Taneja
 Sushil Tayagi as Mr. Surinder
Sumit Vats as Groom's Friend in Marriage (Cameo Role only Episode No 6)

Special appearance

Narendra Chanchal as Devotional Singer Special Appearance for Jagdamba, Maa Ambe "JAGRAATA" (Maha Episode No 30), (Episode No 31)

References

External links

Zee TV original programming
Indian drama television series
2009 Indian television series debuts
2010 Indian television series endings
Television shows set in Delhi